2013 State Basketball League season may refer to:

2013 MSBL season, Men's SBL season
2013 WSBL season, Women's SBL season